Frimpong Yaw Addo is a Ghanaian politician and member of the Seventh Parliament of the Fourth Republic of Ghana and Eight parliament of the Fourth Republic of Ghana representing the Manso Adubia Constituency in the Ashanti Region on the ticket of the New Patriotic Party. He is currently the Deputy Minister for Food and Agriculture.

Early life and education 
Addo was born on 2 September 1962 in a town called Manso Gyeduako in the Amansie South District in the Ashanti Region. He had his Bachelor of Arts degree in Sociology and Diploma in English from University of Cape Coast. He also had his Executive Masters certificate in Conflict, Peace and Security in 2016 at the Kofi Annan International Peace Keeping Training Center in Accra.

Career 
Addo was the Manager of corporate affairs department at Private Ent. Foundation. He was also the Social and Environment impact expert at Comptran Engineering. He was also the Social and Environment impact expert at Transtel Consult. He was also the programs liaison officer at National Democratic Institute for International Affairs.

Political career 
Addo is a member of the New Patriotic Party and currently the member of parliament for Manso Adubia Constituency in the Ashanti Region. He became the first MP for his constituency after emerging top in the 2012 Ghanaian General Elections. He was then re-elected for the second term in the 2016 Ghanaian General Elections where he obtained 69.86% of the total votes cast. In the 2020 General elections, he won the parliamentary seat with 17,652 votes making 38.8% of the total votes cast whiles the NDC parliamentary candidate Simon Kwaku Agyei had 10,753 votes making 23.6% of the total votes. The Independent candidate Kofi Osei-Afoakwa also had 17,149 votes making 37.7% of the total votes cast.

Committees 
Addo is a member of Poverty Reduction Strategy Committee and also a member of Environment, Science and Technology Committee.

Personal life 
He is a Christian and married with five children. He likes farming and soccer.

References

Ghanaian MPs 2017–2021
1962 births
New Patriotic Party politicians
Living people
Ghanaian MPs 2021–2025
University of Cape Coast alumni